Limnobium, common names spongeplant and American frogbit, is a group of aquatic plants in the Hydrocharitaceae described as a genus in 1814. It is widespread in freshwater environments in Latin America, the West Indies, and the United States.

Species
 Limnobium laevigatum (Humb. & Bonpl. ex Willd.) Heine - Mexico, Central and South America, West Indies
 Limnobium spongia (Bosc) Steud. - USA (Lower Mississippi Valley, Southern Coastal Plain from TX to DE; occasionally elsewhere as a waif)

Formerly included
Limnobium dubium (Blume) Shäffer-Fehre - Hydrocharis dubia (Blume) Backer

References

Hydrocharitaceae
Hydrocharitaceae genera
Freshwater plants